Connor Steven Randall (born 21 October 1995) is an English professional footballer who plays as a defender for Scottish Premiership club Ross County.

Club career

Early career
Randall was born and raised in Melling, Merseyside. He attended Melling Primary School and Maghull High School. Randall played for Waddicar Dolphins (managed by his father) from a young age and it was there at the age of six he was spotted and signed for Liverpool; during his academy career, Randall captained the Under-18s and was a regular for the under-21 team from 2013.

On 17 January 2015, he was loaned out to League Two side Shrewsbury Town on a one-month loan deal. He made his Shrewsbury Town debut on 14 February as a 90th-minute substitute, replacing Jermaine Grandison, in a 2–0 win against AFC Wimbledon at the New Meadow which proved to be the only appearance of his loan.

On 17 September 2015, he got his first call up to the Liverpool senior squad for their UEFA Europa League group stage match against Bordeaux, remaining an unused substitute in the 1–1 away draw. On 28 October, Randall made his Reds debut in a 1–0 League Cup fourth round victory against Bournemouth at Anfield. On 2 December, he featured in the next round of the same competition, helping Liverpool thrash Southampton 6–1 at St Mary's. On 9 December 2015, Randall signed a contract extension with Liverpool. On 17 April 2016, he made his Premier League debut for the club, where Liverpool won  2–1 against Bournemouth.

On 28 July 2017, Randall was loaned to Scottish Premiership side Heart of Midlothian until the end of the season. The following season on 23 August 2018, he joined Rochdale on loan until January 2019.

He was released by Liverpool at the end of the 2018–19 season.

On 12 September 2019, Randall joined newly-promoted Bulgarian First League side Arda Kardzhali on a two-year deal.

Randall moved to Scottish Premiership club Ross County on 25 June 2020.

International career
Randall represented England at under-17 level during the 2011 Nordic Under-17 Football Championship in 2011. He played four matches and scored one goal in the fifth place play-off match against Finland.

Club statistics

References

External links
 
 Profile at the Ross County F.C. website
 FA Profile
 

1995 births
Living people
English footballers
England youth international footballers
Association football defenders
Liverpool F.C. players
Shrewsbury Town F.C. players
Heart of Midlothian F.C. players
Rochdale A.F.C. players
FC Arda Kardzhali players
English Football League players
Premier League players
Scottish Professional Football League players
First Professional Football League (Bulgaria) players
Expatriate footballers in Bulgaria
Footballers from Liverpool
English expatriate footballers
English expatriate sportspeople in Bulgaria
Ross County F.C. players